Formulary may refer to:

Formulary (model document), ancient and medieval collections of models for official writings
Formulary (pharmacy), list of prescription drugs covered by a particular drug benefit plan

See also